Zé Povinho is the cartoon character of a Portuguese everyman created in 1875 by Rafael Bordalo Pinheiro. He became first a symbol of the Portuguese working-class people, and eventually into the unofficial personification of Portugal.

Overview
"Zé", in Portuguese, is a common short form of the name "José" – as "Joe" is for "Joseph", in English – and "Povinho" is a diminutive for "Povo", which means "people". His name is thus the equivalent of "Joe Public", "Joe Everyman", "Joe Shmoe", or "John Doe".

The first appearance of Zé Povinho was on 22 May 1875, in A Lanterna Mágica magazine, although he was not yet given a name. He was named in the 6 December 1875 issue of the same magazine. Rafael Bordalo Pinheiro kept drawing this character throughout his lifetime (nearly another 30 years); the drawings were published in many of the more popular magazines and newspapers such as O António Maria, A Paródia, O Commércio do Porto Illustrado and Pontos nos iis.

Povinho is a well-regarded, kindly man who lives simply, and is regularly depicted as mocking the powerful. He is not a figure of authority but rather a simple man of the people, acting as a tool of criticism against the powerful, the political and elitist fringes of the society, injustice and tyranny.

Zé Povinho became, and still is, a popular character in Portugal. Being drawn as a country laborer led to some aversion and denial from the Portuguese people to be represented as such. Yet his kindness, his will to help others and, most of all, his utter contempt and disrespect for the powerful ones that try to dominate him, made him popular. He ridicules the powerful, laughs at them, and then carries on with his simple life but has the same attitude towards the people's own weaknesses and prejudices.

Gallery

References

Estudos em Homenagem a Jorge Borges de Macedo, Lisbon, INIC, 1992

External link

National personifications
Povinho, Ze
Povinho, Ze
National symbols of Portugal
Portugal in fiction
Povinho, Ze
Povinho, Ze
1875 establishments in Portugal
Comics before 1900